Colleen Smith refers to an AAGPBL player.

Colleen Smith may also refer to:
Colleen Smith (actress) (See List of guest stars on King of the Hill)
Colleen Smith (boxer) (See Sonya Emery)
Colleen Smith (puppeteer) (See That Puppet Game Show)

See also
Colleen Clinkenbeard, (born 1980, Colleen Smith Clinkenbeard), American voice actress